The AN/PVS-5 is a dual-tube night-vision goggle used for aviation and ground support. It uses second-generation image-intensifier tubes. The United States Army still has PVS-5 on supply but are very rarely used. The AN/PVS-5 is based on the SU-50 which was a first-generation night-vision goggle adapted by the United States Air Force in 1971. From 1972 until 1990 the AN/PVS-5 was the mainstay in US Army night vision for aviation. The AN/PVS-5C was not approved for flight because of its auto-gated feature causing the goggle to shut off in bright light. For ground troops the AN/PVS-5 was the sole night-vision goggle until the adaptation of the improved AN/PVS-7. Photographic evidence from Operation Eagle Claw shows US military personnel at Desert One in Iran using in the AN/PVS-5 NVGs.

By today's standards the PVS-5 was a real safety risk for pilots, issues such as a limited field of view, poor light amplification, inability to read maps, and its excessive weight made it difficult to fly while operating them. In 1982 tests were being made for a suitable replacement for the AN/PVS-5 specifically for aviation, this led to the adaptation of the AN/AVS-6 ANVIS in 1989. The ANVIS was the first night-vision goggle used by the United States Army specifically designed for aviation.

The designation AN/PVS translates to Army/Navy Portable Visual Search, according to Joint Electronics Type Designation System guidelines.

References

Infrared imaging
Night vision devices
Military electronics of the United States
United States Army equipment
Military equipment introduced in the 1970s